Matt Donovan (born May 9, 1990) is an American professional ice hockey defenseman currently playing for Adler Mannheim of the Deutsche Eishockey Liga (DEL). Donovan was selected by the New York Islanders in the fourth round (96th overall) of the 2008 NHL Entry Draft.

Playing career
Donovan grew up playing in Oklahoma City's youth hockey program where he initially attended Edmond North High School until the age of 15 before moving to John F. Kennedy High School in Cedar Rapids, Iowa. While in Iowa, Donovan played for the Cedar Rapids RoughRiders of the United States Hockey League (USHL). As a RoughRider, he was named to the USHL All-Rookie Team in his first season (2007–08), and the league's First All-Star Team in the following season.

Donovan made his University of Denver debut on October 9, 2009, and completed his first season as a Pioneer with seven goals and 14 assists for a total of 21 points in 36 games to lead all Western Collegiate Hockey Association (WCHA) defenseman in goals. For his efforts he was rewarded by being named to the Inside College Hockey Freshman All-American team, All-College Hockey News Rookie Team, and All-WCHA Rookie Team.

Donovan was drafted 96th overall in the fourth round of the National Hockey League's (NHL) 2008 draft by the New York Islanders. Upon completing his sophomore season at the University of Denver, he was quickly signed to a professional contract by the Islanders, who assigned him to play for their American Hockey League (AHL) affiliate, the Bridgeport Sound Tigers. Donovan scored a goal and four assists during the final six games of 2010–11 AHL season. For the 2012–13 season, Donovan tied Justin Schultz for the most points among AHL defensemen with 48.

Donovan made his NHL debut on April 3, 2012, against the New Jersey Devils, making him the first Oklahoman born, raised, and trained in the state to play in the NHL. After making the Islanders' roster to start the 2013–14 season, he scored his first NHL goal on October 8, 2013, against Mike Smith of the Phoenix Coyotes.

With the Islanders declining to give Donovan a qualifying offer, on July 1, 2015, the Buffalo Sabres signed Donovan as a free agent to a one-year contract.

After spending the 2015–16 season exclusively within the Sabres' AHL affiliate, the Rochester Americans, Donovan left the NHL as a free agent to sign a one-year contract abroad with Swedish club, Frölunda HC of the Swedish Hockey League (SHL), on July 21, 2016.

Donovan enjoyed two productive seasons in Sweden, before opting to return to North America for the 2018–19 season, securing a one-year AHL contract with the Milwaukee Admirals on June 7, 2018. Donovan instantly made an impact with the Admirals, leading the club in scoring with 12 points through his first 13 games before he was signed by NHL affiliate, the Nashville Predators, on a two-year, two-way contract on November 4, 2018.

Nearing the conclusion of his contract with the Predators, Donovan opted to continue his tenure with the Milwaukee Admirals by signing a two-year AHL contract extension on March 23, 2020.

With the Admirals opting out of playing in the pandemic delayed 2020–21 season, Donovan made a return to Sweden and the SHL, belatedly signing for the remainder of the season with HV71 on January 20, 2021. He posted 2 goals and 7 points in 12 regular season games, unable to help prevent HV71 suffering relegation to the HockeyAllsvenskan (Allsv).

Returning to the Admirals for the following 2021–22 season, Donovan as an alternate captain, contributed with 8 goals and 40 points from the blueline in all 76 regular season games.

On June 17, 2022, Donovan again left the AHL and signed a one-year contract with German club, Adler Mannheim of the DEL.

International play

Donovan was a member of the United States junior hockey team that captured the gold medal in January 2010 at the 2010 World Junior Ice Hockey Championships with a 6–5 overtime victory against Team Canada. Throughout the seven games Donovan gained three goals and two assists with a plus-6 rating.

Career statistics

Regular season and playoffs

International

Awards and honors

References

External links
 

1990 births
Living people
Adler Mannheim players
American men's ice hockey defensemen
Bridgeport Sound Tigers players
Denver Pioneers men's ice hockey players
Frölunda HC players
HV71 players
Ice hockey people from Oklahoma
Milwaukee Admirals players
Nashville Predators players
New York Islanders draft picks
New York Islanders players
Sportspeople from Edmond, Oklahoma
Rochester Americans players